Børge Brende (born  25 September 1965) is a Norwegian politician and diplomat, and has been the president of the World Economic Forum since 2017. A member of the Conservative Party, he previously was Minister of Foreign Affairs from 2013 to 2017, Minister of the Environment from 2001 to 2004 and Minister of Trade and Industry from 2004 to 2005. He was elected to the Norwegian Parliament from 1997 to 2009.

Career
Brende was chairman of the United Nations Commission on Sustainable Development from 2003 to 2004 as Norway's Environment Minister. In 2006, he was one of the candidates shortlisted to succeed Klaus Töpfer as executive director of the United Nations Environment Programme (UNEP), alongside Achim Steiner of Germany and Rajendra K. Pachauri of India; the post eventually went to Steiner.

In January 2008, Brende joined the World Economic Forum as managing director, particularly in charge of relations with governments and civil society. In 2009, Brende joined the Norwegian Red Cross as Secretary General. He re-joined the World Economic Forum in 2011 as managing director with responsibility for policy initiatives and engagement of the Forum's non-business constituents. From 2009 to 2011 Brende was Secretary General of Red Cross Norway.

He has been the chairman of Mesta, Norway's largest contracting group in the area of road and highway maintenance. He was also a member of the board of Statoil (Equinor). Brende started in 2005 as international vice-chairman of the China Council for International Cooperation on Environment and Development, an advisory board to the State Council. Brende was the deputy leader of the Conservative Party from 1994 to 1998.

As Foreign Minister of Norway, Brende normalised the relationship with China. Together with the Foreign Minister of Cuba he was the "guarantor" of the Colombian peace process. As the Norwegian Minister of Trade and Industry, Brende improved the framework conditions for trade and industry, and for innovation and development. By the end of his term in office, funding for innovation had increased by 30%. As a minister of the Environment he was in charge of an increase of the national park area of Norway of more than 50%. As Secretary General of Norwegian Red Cross Brende was leading some of the largest relief operations in the society's history; in Haiti and Pakistan.

Minister of Foreign Affairs (2013–2017)

In October 2014, Brende – in his capacity as Chairman of the Ad-Hoc Liaison Committee (AHLC) – co-hosted the Cairo Conference on Palestine, an international donor conference on reconstructing the Gaza Strip, which garnered $5.4 billion in pledges.

In 2015, Brende negotiated an interim agreement between Norway and the other coastal states in the Arctic – Canada, Denmark (on behalf of its territory of Greenland), Russia and the United States – on prohibiting commercial fishing in the increasingly ice-free international waters of the Arctic.

In January 2016, Brende was appointed by United Nations Secretary-General Ban Ki-moon to the High-level Advisory Group for Every Woman Every Child.

World Economic Forum 

On 15 September 2017, it was announced that Brende will be the president of the World Economic Forum from mid-October 2017.

Other activities

International organizations
 Asian Infrastructure Investment Bank (AIIB), Ex-Officio Member of the Board of Governors (2016-2017)
 Multilateral Investment Guarantee Agency (MIGA), World Bank Group, Ex-Officio Member of the Board of Governors (2013-2017)
 World Bank, Ex-Officio Member of the Board of Governors (2013-2017)

Corporate boards
 Statoil, Member of the Board (2012-2013)
 Mesta, Chairman of the Board (2009–2011)

Non-profit organizations
 Bilderberg Group, Member of the Steering Committee
 P4G – Partnering for Green Growth and the Global Goals 2030, Member of the Board of Directors (since 2019)
 World Economic Forum (WEF), Member of the Europe Policy Group (since 2017)
 Norwegian Defence University College, Deputy Chairman of the Advisory Board (2010–2011)

Recognition
 2004 – Order of the Phoenix
 2005 – Order of St. Olav
 2005 – Order of Merit of the Italian Republic 
 2018 – Order of San Carlos

Personal life
Brende is married and has two sons.

See also
List of foreign ministers in 2017
List of current foreign ministers

References

External links
 Brende's CV at the Ministry of Trade and Industry

|-

|-

|-

1965 births
20th-century Norwegian politicians
21st-century Norwegian politicians
Conservative Party (Norway) politicians
Foreign Ministers of Norway
Living people
Members of the Storting
Ministers of Climate and the Environment of Norway
Ministers of Trade and Shipping of Norway